KKCI 102.5 FM is a radio station licensed to Goodland, Kansas. The station broadcasts a Classic rock format and is owned by Melia Communications, Inc.

References

External links
KKCI's website

KCI
Classic rock radio stations in the United States